Mohammed Ali Shaker (Arabic: محمد علي شاكر ; born 27 April 1997), known as Mohammed Shaker, is an Emirati footballer who plays for the United Arab Emirates national football team and Al Ain FC as a defender.

External links

References

Living people
1997 births
Place of birth missing (living people)
Emirati footballers
United Arab Emirates international footballers
Association football defenders
Al Ain FC players
Ajman Club players
UAE Pro League players